The 1953 All-Ireland Minor Hurling Championship was the 23rd staging of the All-Ireland Minor Hurling Championship since its establishment by the Gaelic Athletic Association in 1928.

Tipperary entered the championship as the defending champions.

On 6 September 1953 Tipperary won the championship following an 8-6 to 3-6 defeat of Dublin in the All-Ireland final. This was their second All-Ireland title in-a-row and their eighth overall.

Results

All-Ireland Minor Hurling Championship

Semi-finals

Final

External links
 All-Ireland Minor Hurling Championship: Roll Of Honour

Minor
All-Ireland Minor Hurling Championship